Andrew Michael may refer to:

 Andrew Michael (entrepreneur) (born 1980), British entrepreneur
 Andrew Michael Ramsay (1686–1743), writer

See also
Andrew McMichael (born 1943), English immunologist
Michael Andrew (disambiguation)